The siege of Kozelsk was one of the main events of the Western (Kipchak) March of the Mongols (1236–1242) and the Mongol invasion of Rus' (1237–1240) at the end of the Mongol campaign in North-Eastern Russia (1237–1238). The Mongols laid a siege in the spring of 1238 and eventually conquered and destroyed the town of Kozelsk, one of the subsidiary princely centers of the Principality of Chernigov.

Background 
Taking the city of Torzhok on 5 March 1238 after a two-week siege, the Mongols continued to Novgorod. However, they failed to reach the city, mainly because they had difficulties moving in the woods, and after advancing around 100 kilometers at the unknown place designated in the chronicles as the Ignach Cross, they abandoned the plans to conquer Novgorod, turned south, and divided into two groups.

Some of the forces led by Kadan and Storms passed over the Eastern route through the Ryazan land. The main forces led by Batu Khan passed through Dolgomost 30 km east of Smolensk, then entered the Chernigov Principality on the upper Gums, burned Vshchizh, but then abruptly turned to the northeast, bypassing the Bryansk and Karachev, at the end of March 1238 went to the Kozelsk on the Zhizdra River.

At that time the city was the capital of the Principality at the head of twelve-year-old Prince Vasily, grandson of Mstislav Svyatoslavich of Chernigov, who was killed at the Battle of Kalka in 1223. The city was well fortified: surrounded by ramparts built on them walls, but the Mongols had powerful siege equipment.

Reasons for the long siege 
The duration of the siege, according to various versions, could be affected by several factors in different combinations, including:
 The overall decline in the fighting capacity of the Mongol army after the first phase of the campaign.
 The slush made impassable valleys of the rivers Zhizdra and into it Kozelsk Druguse and locked the Mongol army on the watershed.
 The slush turned the city into an island fortress.
 Kozelsk was appointed a place of gathering troops.

Notes 
 Duration of freeze-up. Map
 Civilian V. A. Memory. Roman-Gazeta, No. 16-17 (950-951). Goskomizdat, 1982

Literature 
 Nikiforovsky chronicle. Volume 35
 Rashid-Eddin. The Book Of Chronicles. History Of The Mongols. Essay Rashid-Eddine. Introduction: About the Turkish and Mongolian tribes, Transl. from Persian, with introduction and notes by I. P. Berezina // Note the Empire. Architecture. society. 1858. T. 14.
 Karamzin Nikolay Mikhailovich. History of the Russian state. Volume 3

Links 
 The conquest of Russia by the Tatar-Mongols\\Interactive map
 Nikiforovsky chronicle. Nikiforovskiy chronicle. Vol. 35. Lithuanian-Belorussian Chronicles
 Karganov V. End the Horde's reign
 Diorama "defense of Kozelsk 1238"
 Vladimir Chivilikhin. Memory. Book two
 Svechin Andrew. Question about apples and Apple trees mid XIII century
 Gumilev L. N. From Rus to Russia. Part two. In Alliance with the Horde. 2. Facing East

Kozelsk
Kozelsk
Kozelsk
Kozelsk
13th century in Russia
1238 in Europe
Kaluga Oblast